Hexaiodobenzene is a chemical compound with the formula C6I6. Structurally, it is a derivative of benzene, in which all hydrogen atoms are replaced by iodine atoms. It forms orange crystals that are poorly soluble in all solvents. It adopts the expected structure with a central C6 ring.

Preparation 
The compound was first prepared by iodination of benzoic acid in the presence of hot fuming sulfuric acid.  Another method of synthesis is the reaction between benzene with periodic acid and potassium iodide in sulfuric acid at 100 °C. This method instead produces 1,2,4,5-tetraiodobenzene if done at room temperature.

Properties

Physical properties 
Hexaiodobenzene forms orange needles that are practically insoluble in water, but sparingly soluble in N-methyl-2-pyrrolidone and dimethyl sulfoxide. It melts at 430 °C, but also already begins to show some decomposition at 370 °C, forming I2.

Crystallographic properties 
The crystals are monoclinic and pseudohexagonal, with centrosymmetric C6I6 units. The carbon atoms lie in a plane with C–C distances about 141 pm, while the nearby iodine atoms show very small displacements (about 4 pm) above and below the ring. The shortest intermolecular distance, 376 pm, is notably short compared to twice the Van der Waals radius, which is 430 pm. The structure is retained at high pressures up to 9.7 GPa.

References 

Iodoarenes